With Love is a studio album by Rosemary Clooney. It was released in 1980 on Concord Records. Unlike many of her Concord albums, it mixes contemporary pop (from writers like Billy Joel, Melissa Manchester and Marvin Hamlisch) with traditional pop standards. On LP, the A side featured four contemporary pop songs, while the B side was a more typical jazz and cabaret set featuring a bossa nova, two Broadway theater standards, and two 1940s pop standards.

Track listing
 "Just the Way You Are" (Billy Joel) – 5:11
 "The Way We Were" (Alan Bergman, Marilyn Bergman, Marvin Hamlisch) – 5:04
 "Alone at Last" (Phil Cody, Neil Sedaka) – 4:57
 "Come in from the Rain" (Melissa Manchester, Carole Bayer Sager) – 4:53
 "Meditation" (Norman Gimbel, Antônio Carlos Jobim, Newton Mendonça) – 4:47
 "Hello, Young Lovers" (Oscar Hammerstein II, Richard Rodgers) – 3:50
 "Just in Time" (Betty Comden, Adolph Green, Jule Styne) – 3:20
 "Tenderly" (Walter Gross, Jack Lawrence) – 5:11
 "Will You Still Be Mine?" (Tom Adair, Matt Dennis) – 3:04

Personnel

 Rosemary Clooney – vocal
 Scott Hamilton - tenor saxophone
 Warren Vache - cornet and flugelhorn
 Cal Tjader - vibraphone
 Nat Pierce - piano
 Cal Collins - guitar
 Bob Maize - bass
 Jake Hanna -drums

References 

1980 albums
Rosemary Clooney albums
Concord Records albums